The Burgraviate of Rheineck was a burgraviate of the Holy Roman Empire. It was a member of the Upper Rhenish Circle.

References

Citations

Books

Websites

Upper Rhenish Circle
Former states and territories of Rhineland-Palatinate